The String Quartet No. 23 in F major, K. 590, was written in June 1790 by Wolfgang Amadeus Mozart. It is the third of the Prussian Quartets.

There are four movements:

 Allegro moderato, in F major
 Andante, in C major
 Menuetto: Allegretto
 Allegro, in F major

The quartet was written for and dedicated to the King of Prussia, Friedrich Wilhelm II, an amateur cellist. It is written in a similar style to the quartets of Joseph Haydn. Mozart and his friend Karl Lichnowsky met the king in Potsdam in April 1789. Mozart played before the king in Berlin on 26 May of that year. A typical performance lasts 23 to 25 minutes.

The Menuetto is distinguished by the evolution in the main minuet sections from a fairly conventional theme to a highly chromatic, driven transition.

References

External links
 
 
 Recording by the Orion String Quartet from the Isabella Stewart Gardner Museum in MP3 format

23
1790 compositions
Compositions in F major